Boladé Apithy (born August 21, 1985 in Dijon, France) is a French right-handed sabre fencer.

His brother Yémi is also a sabre fencer; he represents Benin.

Medal Record

European Championship

Grand Prix

World Cup

References

External links

 
 Profile at the European Fencing Confederation
 
 

1985 births
French male sabre fencers
Living people
Olympic fencers of France
Fencers at the 2012 Summer Olympics
Sportspeople from Dijon
Mediterranean Games bronze medalists for France
Mediterranean Games medalists in fencing
Competitors at the 2013 Mediterranean Games
Fencers at the 2020 Summer Olympics
21st-century French people
French people of Beninese descent